The Voice is a print and online newspaper based in Botswana founded by Beata Kasale and Don Laurence Moore.  The Voice was founded in Francistown in 1993 as The Francistowner Extra; in 1999 it opened offices in the national capital, Gaborone. It has adopted a tabloid format which means shorter stories, bigger pictures and bolder headlines. The overall newspaper style encouraged journalist to develop a creative writing identity. Readership is at 30,000 copies per edition containing mostly human interest stories.

Awards and recognition
The Voice has been a recipient of several awards including the 2008 Sol Plaatje Leadership and excellence Award in the region, in recognition of its effort in reporting HIV/AIDS; the PMR Africa Diamond Arrow which recognizes organizations that do their best to help stimulate the Botswana's economic growth and development. Among others the newspaper was awarded the coveted Print Media of the Year by the Botswana National Sports Council in 2015.

See also 
Azhizhi
Mmegi
Botswana Guardian
The Botswana Gazette
Yarona FM

References

External links

Newspapers published in Botswana
Francistown

1993 establishments in Botswana
Publications established in 1993